The Mitsubishi GTO is a front-engine, all-wheel/front-wheel drive grand touring/sports car manufactured and marketed by Mitsubishi from 1990 until 2000 over three different generations. Manufactured in a three-door hatchback coupé body style in Nagoya, Japan, the 2+2 four-seaters were marketed in the Japanese domestic market (JDM) as the GTO, and globally as Mitsubishi 3000GT. In North America, it was sold both as the Mitsubishi 3000GT (1991–1999) and the Dodge Stealth (1991–1996), a badge engineered, mechanically identical captive import. As a collaborative effort between Chrysler and Mitsubishi Motors, Chrysler was responsible for the Stealth's exterior styling.

The car was based on Mitsubishi's Sigma/Diamante and retained their transverse mounted 3-liter, 24-valve V6 engines and front-wheel-drive layout. The GTO's engines were naturally aspirated or with twin-turbochargers and were also available with active aerodynamics (automatically adjusting front and rear spoilers), four-wheel-steering, full-time all-wheel-drive and adaptive suspension.

Mitsubishi marketed a retractable hardtop variant, which were engineered and converted from coupé models in California by ASC, and sold as the GT Spyder or VR4 Spyder for model years 1993–1995. These were the first fully automated retractable hardtop marketed since the 1959 Ford Skyliner.

The JDM model took its name from the Galant GTO, a two-door hardtop coupé marketed by the company in the early 1970s, which in turn took its name from the Ferrari 250 GTO, short for Gran Turismo Omologata – "Omologata" signifying that it met motorsport homologation requirements.

Overview

Following the successful showing of the Mitsubishi HSR and Mitsubishi HSX concept cars at the 1989 Tokyo Motor Show, Mitsubishi unveiled the new GTO as a 2+2 seating grand touring car in order to compete with the Mazda Cosmo, Nissan 300ZX, Subaru SVX, and the Toyota Supra. They resurrected the GTO name, and the car went on to serve as Mitsubishi's flagship for the remainder of the decade. Despite the cachet of the badge at home, it was marketed as the Mitsubishi 3000GT and as the Dodge Stealth outside Japan; the company was concerned that connoisseurs would object to the evocative nameplate from the Ferrari 250 GTO and Pontiac GTO being used on a Japanese vehicle.

Each was built on the same production line at Mitsubishi's plant in Nagoya, Japan. Its Japanese introduction coincided with the softening Japanese economy, subsequently known as the "bubble economy".

JDM GTOs were marketed at Mitsubishi's Car Plaza retail chain, with JDM buyers paying additional annual road tax as well as elevated taxes for being classified as a large car by Japan's exterior dimension regulations.

A Dodge Stealth was scheduled as a 1991 Indianapolis 500 pace car, until the United Auto Workers (UAW) rejected it because of its Japanese rather than US-manufacture. A prototype of the Dodge Viper was substituted in place of it. Still used as a backup pace car, eventual race winner Rick Mears received a Dodge Stealth for winning the race and dealers sold pace car replica editions, as the Viper did not begin production until later that year.

1990–1993 (Z16A)   
Early models were internally designated Z16A and incorporated full-time four-wheel drive, four-wheel steering, active aerodynamics with automatically adjusting front and rear spoilers, sport/tour exhaust modes and electronically controlled suspension (ECS). The GTO, 3000GT and Stealth featured pop-up headlights and articulated blister caps on the hood to accommodate the ECS controllers at the top of the strut turrets. The Dodge Stealth featured a signature cross-hair front bumper fascia and crescent-shaped rear spoiler — and did not include active aerodynamics. In 1993, the engine went to a 4-bolt main and a forged crankshaft, some of the early production models still received the cast crank.

North American market
In North America, both the Mitsubishi 3000GT as well as the Dodge Stealth were available.  Two different powertrains were offered on the 3000GT while the Stealth had three different options.  The base 3-door hatchback Stealth came equipped with a 3.0-liter 12-valve SOHC V6 engine producing  at 5,500rpm.  The base 3000GT and SL model and the Dodge Stealth ES and R/T model came equipped with a 3.0-liter DOHC V6 engine producing . The VR-4 and R/T Turbo came equipped with a twin turbocharged 3.0-liter DOHC V6 engine producing  at 5,500 rpm.  A 5-speed manual transmission was standard and a 4-speed automatic was an option on all models except the turbocharged variants.  The 3000GT SL and Stealth R/T included an electronically controlled suspension as well as other features such as anti-lock brakes and automatic climate control while the turbocharged models further added performance options such as permanent 4-wheel drive, 4-wheel steering, limited-slip differential, active aerodynamics and came with Z rated 17-inch tires.

European market
In Europe, instead of the TD04-09B turbochargers used on Japanese and US Twin Turbo models, the EU-spec model received the higher capacity TD04-13G turbochargers. While power output is no higher than contemporary market models, these have lower discharge temperatures to better handle the prolonged high speeds possible on the German Autobahn, along with an upgraded transmission.

Reviews and performance
Automotive magazines quoted 0- acceleration times ranging from 4.9 seconds to 6.0 seconds and quarter mile times of 13.6-13.9 seconds at  Dodge claims a 0-60 of 4.89 seconds for the 1991 R/T turbo models.

Magazines from the era praised its strong acceleration and grip as well as its full time AWD system allowing for all season use. In a comparison test by AutoWeek the $34,423 1991 Mitsubishi 3000GT VR-4 did 0-60mph in 5.1 seconds beating the lighter $61,000 Acura NSX which hit 60mph in 5.3 seconds.

1994–1997 (Z15A/Z16A)

Facelift models were internally designated Z15A (2WS) and Z16A (4WS) and featured a revised front bumper to accommodate projector beam headlights and small, round projector fog lights. They were unveiled in August 1993 in Japan and gradually made their way to other markets as the earlier cars sold out. Some markets, such as the UK, did not get these models until as late as 1996. The caps on the hood were replaced with integrated sheet metal blisters, and revised side air vents and rear bumpers were added. The interior was redesigned with dual air bags, a new audio system, and revised air conditioning refrigerant.

The VR-4 model now included a six-speed Getrag manual transmission with revised gear ratios.  Larger wheel/tire combinations were available beginning in 1995. The base and SL model received 16-inch wheels in silver or chrome with 225/55 tires, while the VR-4 now had 18-inch chrome wheels with 245/40 tires (the Spyder had the standard 17-inch with higher profile tires from 1994 to handle the additional  of weight).

With subsequent price increases, features were discontinued: the tunable exhaust was phased out after 1994 model year, the ECS after 1995 model year, and the active aerodynamics disappeared after 1996. This was also when Chrysler ceased sales of the Dodge Stealth captive import, and for the remainder of its life only Mitsubishi-badged versions were available.

Spyder
Chrysler and Mitsubishi worked with ASC to engineer and convert 3000GTs into retractable hardtops, marketed as the Spyder SL and Spyder VR4 for 1995 and 1996 model years.

In 1995, Mitsubishi's 3000GT Spyder was available in four color combinations: red with grey leather interior, black with ivory leather interior, white pearl with grey, and martinique yellow with ivory leather interior. In 1996 the 3000GT Spyder was available in red with tan interior, black pearl with tan leather, white pearl with tan leather interior, and green pearl with tan leather. SL Spyders were only available with an automatic transmission while the VR4 Spyder was only available with a 6-speed manual.

GTO MR
The GTO MR model appeared in the Japanese market in August 1994. The ‘Mitsubishi Racing’ or MR moniker, has been used on a few other performance Mitsubishis such as the Lancer Evolution, and usually meant a lighter model. The GTO MR was essentially a lightweight GTO Twin Turbo that deleted 4WS, ABS, ECS and Active Aero, but was mechanically identical to the normal GTO Twin Turbo aside from a final drive ratio of 4.154. Chassis numbers for the MR start with Z15A. The AWD system featured in the MR received the same 45% front 55% rear split ratio as the other turbo models.

Best Motoring, a Japanese television program about Japanese cars, featured the 1994 GTO MR in an hour long program where it beat the lighter R32 Skyline GT-R over a mile in acceleration.

Beckenbauer edition
In 1994, Mitsubishi released a limited edition of what was now the previous generation 3000GT, branded as "Beckenbauer Edition." Honoring Franz Beckenbauer. All were painted Lamborghini yellow and were equipped with a Remus sports exhaust, OZ Futura rims, a numbered plate signed by Beckenbauer, and a C-Netz mobile phone system. Only 30 were made, sold through 1995.

Reception
The redesign of the second generation 3000GT brought it up to date, especially through the loss of pop-up headlights and the front strut caps and resulting smoother hood. The Tuneable Exhaust System was phased out in 1995 and the Active Aero was phased out in 1996. A notable change was the brake redesign, facelift models received 2-piston rear brake calipers and larger front brakes that showed no sign of fading under heavy use unlike the early models. Braking distances improved slightly. The new 6-speed was geared well and paired with the extra horsepower and torque allowed the car to out-accelerate its rivals from a standing start.
These changes made all models lighter, the VR-4 was now 3,737 pounds and the SL 3,263 pounds.

Though heavy, it was comfortable and easy to drive fast. Thanks to the ample power, it could be taken around a track quickly, with noted under steer and a lack of feedback.

1997–2000 (Z15AM) 

The SOHC engine, was added to the Mitsubishi 3000GTs after the discontinuation of the Stealth. The 3000GT's featuring the single cam engine had a weight of 3131 pounds provided that they were not offered with the sunroof and leather seats. 

The 1997-2000 3000GTs are separated by pre- or post-facelift. Slower sales in the American sports car market led to the major facelift plans for 1997 being abandoned. Minor cosmetic changes were implemented instead including a new front bumper and rainbow-shaped arched type wing. 

In 1999, the car received its last exterior makeover facelift; with the new aggressive front bumper, headlamps, turn signals and sail panels. A true inverted airfoil spoiler coined the "Combat Wing" only for the 1999 VR-4 were used to distinguish it from previous models. Non-Turbo models did not receive the "Combat Wing" and kept the arched spoiler from the pre-facelift. 1999 was the final year the 3000GT was available in the U.S. market. With sales slowing to a trickle and new side impact regulations looming, production for the Japanese domestic market finally ceased in 2000. A last two cars were sold the following year.

Gallery

References

Bibliography

External links

 GTO press release, Mitsubishi-motors.com, August 25, 1998 (Japanese)
 

Gto
2000s cars
All-wheel-drive vehicles
Front-wheel-drive sports cars
Vehicles with four-wheel steering
Coupés
Cars introduced in 1990
Cars discontinued in 2000